Wood Lake Nature Center is a  nature preserve within Richfield, Minnesota. In addition to Wood Lake, the park contains mixed lowland forest, cattail marsh and restored prairie habitats. Three miles of walking trails and boardwalks surround the lake as well as observation shelters, docks, a picnic area, and an outdoor amphitheater. There is an Interpretive Center in Wood Lake Nature Center staffed by naturalists who offer year round class for adults and children. 
According to the Wood Lake Nature Center's website, Wood Lake was once a recreational lake surrounded by homes. Most of the Wood Lakes's water drained during the 1950s, due in part to the effects of the construction of nearby Interstate Highway 35W. The city of Richfield founded the Wood Lake Nature Center in 1971.

Friends of Wood Lake
In 1991, Friends of Wood Lake (FOWL) was launched as an advocacy and fundraising group in support of the nature center. Major fundraising events include the Urban Wildland Half Marathon and 5K Race and Friends of Wood Lake Golf Klassic.

References

External links
Wood Lake Nature Center
Urban Wildland Half Marathon and 5K
Friends of Wood Lake Golf Klassic

Protected areas of Hennepin County, Minnesota
Richfield, Minnesota
Nature centers in Minnesota
Education in Hennepin County, Minnesota
Museums in Hennepin County, Minnesota